Street Wars may refer to:
 Street Wars (TV series), a police reality television programme.
 StreetWars, a water gun tournament
 Street Wars: Constructor Underworld, a video game
 Street Wars, a DVD "movie" starring Steven Seagal, comprising two episodes of the TV series True Justice